Adiaké is a town in southeastern Ivory Coast, located on the western shore of Aby Lagoon. It is a sub-prefecture of and the seat of Adiaké Department in Sud-Comoé Region, Comoé District. Adiaké is also a commune.

In 2021, the population of the sub-prefecture of Adiaké was 50,556.

Villages
The 23 villages of the sub-prefecture of Adiaké and their population in 2014 are:

Climate

References

Sub-prefectures of Sud-Comoé
Communes of Sud-Comoé